Club Nacional de Football's 2010–11 season is the club's 112th year of existence and the club's 108th in the top-flight.
Nacional this season going to play the 2011–12 Uruguayan Primera División season, the 2011 Copa Sudamericana and the 2012 Copa Libertadores.

Squad

As of February 7, 2012

Winter transfers

Summer transfers

Player statistics

Team stats
{| class="wikitable" style="text-align: center"
|-
!
!Primera División
!Copa Sudamericana
!Torneo Preparación
!Torneo de Honor
!Copa Libertadores
|-
|align=left| Games played          || 21 || 2 || 1 || 1 || 4
|-
|align=left| Games won             || 12 || 0 || 0 || 0 || 2
|-
|align=left| Games drawn           || 6 || 0 || 0 || 1 || 0
|-
|align=left| Games lost            || 3 || 2 || 1 || 0 || 2
|-
|align=left| Goals for             || 43 || 0 || 2 || 1 || 4 
|-
|align=left| Goals against         || 21 || 2 || 3 || 1 || 4
|-
|align=left| Players used          || 34 || 14 || 18 || 16 || 21
|-
|align=left| Yellow cards          || 60 || 7 || 3 || 1 || 13
|-
|align=left| Red cards             || 5 || 0 || 0 || 0 || 2
|-

Squad stats
Updated on 31 March 2012
Players in italics left the team during the season.

Disciplinary records
Players in italics left the team during the season.
Last updated on 31 March 2012.

Club

Starting XI

Current technical staff

Competitions

Pre-season

Pan American Games break

Copa Bimbo

Copa Comunicaciones Antel

Inter-tournaments Tour

Overall

Uruguayan Primera División

Torneo Apertura

Matches

Torneo Clausura

Matches

Aggregate table

Results summary

Results by round

Relegation

Copa Sudamericana

Torneo Preparación

Torneo de Honor

Copa Libertadores

See also
2011–12 in Uruguayan football

References

External links
 Club Nacional de Football official web site 

Club Nacional de Football seasons